The 2014 FIFA World Cup qualification UEFA Group H was a UEFA qualifying group for the 2014 FIFA World Cup. The group comprised England, Montenegro, Ukraine, Poland, Moldova and San Marino.

The group winners, England, qualified directly for the 2014 FIFA World Cup. Ukraine placed among the eight best runners-up and advanced to the play-offs, where they were drawn to play home-and-away matches against France. After winning the first match by two goals, they lost the second by three and thus failed to qualify for the World Cup.

Standings

Matches
The match schedule was determined at a meeting in Warsaw, Poland, on 23 November 2011.

Notes

Goalscorers
There were 108 goals scored in 30 matches for an average of 3.60 goals per match.

7 goals

 Wayne Rooney

4 goals

 Frank Lampard
 Danny Welbeck
 Eugen Sidorenco
 Andrija Delibašić
 Dejan Damjanović
 Jakub Błaszczykowski
 Andriy Yarmolenko
 Marko Dević

3 goals

 Jermain Defoe
 Robert Lewandowski
 Yevhen Khacheridi
 Yevhen Konoplyanka
 Yevhen Seleznyov
 Roman Bezus

2 goals

 Steven Gerrard
 Daniel Sturridge
 Alex Oxlade-Chamberlain
 Alexandru Antoniuc
 Fatos Bećiraj
 Stevan Jovetić
 Mirko Vučinić
 Elsad Zverotić
 Adrian Mierzejewski
 Łukasz Piszczek
 Piotr Zieliński
 Artem Fedetskiy

1 goal

 Leighton Baines
 Rickie Lambert
 James Milner
 Andros Townsend
 Ashley Young
 Igor Armaș
 Serghei Dadu
 Alexandru Epureanu
 Viorel Frunză
 Artur Ioniță
 Alexandru Suvorov
 Luka Đorđević
 Nikola Drinčić
 Kamil Glik
 Jakub Kosecki
 Waldemar Sobota
 Łukasz Teodorczyk
 Jakub Wawrzyniak
 Alessandro Della Valle
 Edmar
 Denys Harmash
 Oleh Husyev
 Vitaliy Mandzyuk
 Yaroslav Rakytskiy
 Roman Zozulya

1 own goal

 Branko Bošković (playing against England)
 Alessandro Della Valle (playing against England)

Discipline

Attendances

References

External links
Results and schedule for UEFA Group H (FIFA.com version)
Results and schedule for UEFA Group H (UEFA.com version)

H
2012–13 in English football
qual
2012–13 in Polish football
2013–14 in Polish football
2012–13 in Ukrainian football
2013–14 in Ukrainian football
2012–13 in Montenegrin football
2013–14 in Montenegrin football
2012–13 in San Marino football
2013–14 in San Marino football
2012–13 in Moldovan football
2013–14 in Moldovan football